Shorea gibbosa (also called yellow meranti) is a large emergent rainforest tree species in the family Dipterocarpaceae. It is native to Sumatra, Borneo, Peninsular Malaysia and Singapore. The tallest measured specimen is 81.1 metres tall, in the Tawau Hills National Park, in Sabah on the island of Borneo.

References

gibbosa
Trees of Malaya
Trees of Borneo
Trees of Peninsular Malaysia
Flora of Singapore
Trees of Sumatra
Critically endangered flora of Asia
Taxonomy articles created by Polbot